Buschi Niebergall (July 18, 1938 –  January 9, 1990) was a German free jazz musician. His given name was Hans-Helmut, and late in life, his friends called him Johannes.

Born in the city of Marburg into a family of academics (his father was a professor of theology and temporarily rector of the University of Marburg), Niebergall enrolled in medical school. Playing acoustic guitar, he got in contact with other musicians and quit his studies. As double-bass player Niebergall became co-founder of several of the first and most influential Free Jazz formations of Germany during the mid-1960s. Gunter Hampels quintet "Heartplants" and "Voices" by the Manfred Schoof quintet are two excellent examples of this independent European free jazz development.

A founding member of the Globe Unity Orchestra since 1966, Niebergall collaborated with many musicians playing freely improvised music, including Peter Brötzmann, Don Cherry, Alfred Harth, Evan Parker, Alexander von Schlippenbach, Irène Schweizer, John Tchicai. During the early 1970s he played in Albert Mangelsdorff's various quartets and quintets. After 1980 he chose a life in isolation in Frankfurt a.M., with the exception of occasional stints within a "Jazz und Lyrik" project.

Selected discography
 Heartplants (Gunter Hampel (saxes, b cl, fl, vibes), Manfred Schoof (tp, flh), Alexander von Schlippenbach (p), Niebergall (b), Pierre Courbois (dr) 1964. MPS 10526)
 Voices (Manfred Schoof (tp, cornet); Gerd Dudek (ts); Alexander von Schlippenbach (p); Niebergall (b); Jacki Liebezeit (d) 1966.
 The Early Quintet (Manfred Schoof (tp); Gerd Dudek (ts); Alexander von Schlippenbach (p); Buschi Niebergall (b); Jacki Liebezeit (d) 1966. FMP 0540
 Machine Gun (Peter Brötzmann (ts, bs); Willem Breuker (ts); Evan Parker (ts); Fred Van Hove (p); Peter Kowald (b); Buschi Niebergall (b); Han Bennink (d); Sven-Åke Johansson (d). 1968, FMP 0090
 European Echoes (Enrico Rava (tp); Manfred Schoof (tp); Hugh Steinmetz (tp); Peter Brötzmann (ts); Gerd Dudek (ts); Evan Parker (ss); Paul Rutherford (tb); Derek Bailey: (g); Fred Van Hove (p); Alexander von Schlippenbach (p); Irène Schweizer (p); Arjen Gorter (b); Peter Kowald (b); Niebergall (b); Han Bennink (d); Pierre Favre (d) June 1969, Bremen. FMP 0010)
 Birds Of Underground (Albert Mangelsdorff (tb); Heinz Sauer (as, ts); Gerd Dudek (ts, ss, fl); Buschi Niebergall (b); Peter Giger (d)), 1972, MPS.
 Celeste ( Michel Pilz (bcl), Niebergall (b), Uwe Schmitt (d)) 1978, Trion.
 Innovationen für 10 Instrumente Manfred Niehaus (viola); Bernd Konrad (bcl, cbcl, sax); Willem van Manen (tb); Michael Sell (tp); Hans Peter Jahn (cello); Theo Jörgensmann (cl); Niebergall (b); Georg Strüber (b); Hidegard Butscher (viol);  (dr), 1980 Köln, Misp records 506

References
Niebergall's FMP releases
Buschi Niebergall Complete Discography

Avant-garde jazz musicians
German jazz double-bassists
Male double-bassists
People from Marburg
1938 births
1990 deaths
20th-century German musicians
20th-century double-bassists
20th-century German male musicians
German male jazz musicians
Globe Unity Orchestra members